A list of Kannada language films produced in the Kannada film industry in India in 2013.
 Films are generally released every Friday . And Thursday 
 In addition films can be released on specific festival days.

Events
 State Film Awards 2011–12 announced on 14 March.
 60th Filmfare Awards South, held 20 July 2013 in Hyderabad, Andhra Pradesh
 2nd South Indian International Movie Awards, on 12–13 September 2013 in UAE
 Suvarna Film Awards, by Suvarna channel.
 Udaya Film Awards, by Udaya Channel
 Bangalore Times Film Awards

Released films

January–June

July – December

Deaths

References

External links
 Kannada Movies of 2013 at Internet Movie Database
 
 

2013
Lists of 2013 films by country or language
2013 in Indian cinema